Sco-Mule is a live album by the American rock band Gov't Mule, recorded at two 1999 shows in Atlanta, Georgia. It features the band's original members: guitarist Warren Haynes, bass guitarist Allen Woody, and drummer Matt Abts, along with jazz guitarist John Scofield and keyboardist Dan Matrazzo.

These Atlanta performances have been widely traded, discussed and revered by Mule fans for 15 years.  Sco-Mule defies both jazz and jam-band genres, "instead, it sits somewhere in-between, with everyone forgetting about artificial delineation."

Track listing
Recorded at the Georgia Theatre in Athens, Georgia on September 22 and at The Roxy in Atlanta on September 23, 1999.

Bonus disc

Personnel
John Scofield – electric guitar
Warren Haynes – electric guitar
Jimmy Herring – electric guitar (disc 2, track 2)
Mike Barnes – electric rhythm guitar (disc 2, track 5)
Dan Matrazzo – keyboards
Allen Woody – bass guitar
Matt Abts – drums & percussion

References

2015 live albums
Gov't Mule albums